In graph theory, reachability refers to the ability to get from one vertex to another within a graph.

In an undirected graph, reachability between all pairs of vertices can be determined by identifying the connected components of the graph. Any pair of vertices in such a graph can reach each other if and only if they belong to the same connected component; therefore, in such a graph, reachability is symmetric ( reaches  iff  reaches ). The connected components of an undirected graph can be identified in linear time. The remainder of this article focuses on the more difficult problem of determining pairwise reachability in a directed graph (which, incidentally, need not be symmetric).

Definition 

If  is acyclic, then its reachability relation is a partial order; any partial order may be defined in this way, for instance as the reachability relation of its transitive reduction. A noteworthy consequence of this is that since partial orders are anti-symmetric, if  can reach , then we know that  cannot reach .
If  is directed but not acyclic (i.e. it contains at least one cycle), then its reachability relation will correspond to a preorder instead of a partial order.

Algorithms 
Algorithms for determining reachability fall into two classes: those that require preprocessing and those that do not.

If you have only one (or a few) queries to make, it may be more efficient to forgo the use of more complex data structures and compute the reachability of the desired pair directly.  This can be accomplished in linear time using algorithms such as breadth first search or iterative deepening depth-first search.

If you will be making many queries, then a more sophisticated method may be used; the exact choice of method depends on the nature of the graph being analysed. In exchange for preprocessing time and some extra storage space, we can create a data structure which can then answer reachability queries on any pair of vertices in as low as  time.  Three different algorithms and data structures for three different, increasingly specialized situations are outlined below.

Floyd-Warshall Algorithm 

The Floyd–Warshall algorithm can be used to compute the transitive closure of any directed graph, which gives rise to the reachability relation as in the definition, above.

The algorithm requires  time and  space in the worst case. This algorithm is not solely interested in reachability as it also computes the shortest path distance between all pairs of vertices. For graphs containing negative cycles, shortest paths may be undefined, but reachability between pairs can still be noted.

Thorup's Algorithm 

For planar digraphs, a much faster method is available, as described by Mikkel Thorup in 2004. This method can answer reachability queries on a planar graph in  time after spending  preprocessing time to create a data structure of  size. This algorithm can also supply approximate shortest path distances, as well as route information.

An outline of the reachability related sections follows.

Given a graph , the algorithm begins by organizing the vertices into layers starting from an arbitrary vertex . The layers are built in alternating steps by first considering all vertices reachable from the previous step (starting with just ) and then all vertices which reach to the previous step until all vertices have been assigned to a layer. Let  be the last layer created, that is, the lowest value for  such that .

The graph is then re-expressed as a series of digraphs  where each  and where  is the contraction of all previous levels  into a single vertex. Because every dipath appears in at most two consecutive layers, and because
each  is formed by two consecutive layers, every dipath in  appears in its entirety in at least one  (and no more than 2 consecutive such graphs)

For each , three separators are identified which, when removed, break the graph into three components which each contain at most  the vertices of the original. As  is built from two layers of opposed dipaths, each separator may consist of up to 2 dipaths, for a total of up to 6 dipaths over all of the separators. Let  be this set of dipaths. The proof that such separators can always be found is related to the Planar Separator Theorem of Lipton and Tarjan, and these separators can be located in linear time.

For each , the directed nature of  provides for a natural indexing of its vertices from the start to the end of the path.
This information is stored with
each .

Every vertex is labelled as above for each step of the recursion which builds
. As this recursion has logarithmic depth, a total of
 extra information is stored per vertex. From this point, a
logarithmic time query for reachability is as simple as looking over each pair
of labels for a common, suitable . The original paper then works to tune the

In summarizing the analysis of this method, first consider that the layering
approach partitions the vertices so that each vertex is considered only 
times. The separator phase of the algorithm breaks the graph into components
which are at most  the size of the original graph, resulting in a
logarithmic recursion depth.  At each level of the recursion, only linear work
is needed to identify the separators as well as the connections possible between
vertices. The overall result is  preprocessing time with only
 additional information stored for each vertex.

Kameda's Algorithm 

An even faster method for pre-processing, due to T. Kameda in 1975,
can be used if the graph is planar, acyclic, and also exhibits the following additional properties: all 0-indegree and all 0-outdegree vertices appear on the same face (often assumed to be the outer face), and it is possible to partition the boundary of that face into two parts such that all 0-indegree vertices appear on one part, and all
0-outdegree vertices appear on the other (i.e. the two types of vertices do not alternate).

If  exhibits these properties, then we can preprocess the graph in only
 time, and store only  extra bits per vertex, answering
reachability queries for any pair of vertices in  time with a simple
comparison.

Preprocessing performs the following steps. We add a new vertex  which has an edge to each 0-indegree vertex, and another new vertex  with edges from each 0-outdegree vertex. Note that the properties of  allow us to do so while maintaining planarity, that is, there will still be no edge crossings after these additions. For each vertex we store the list of adjacencies (out-edges) in order of the planarity of the graph (for example, clockwise with respect to the graph's embedding). During this traversal, the adjacency list of each vertex is visited from left-to-right as needed. The depth-first traversal is then repeated, but this time the adjacency list of each vertex is visited from right-to-left.

Each

The main result of this method then states that  is reachable from  if and
only if , which is easily calculated in  time.

Related problems 

A related problem is to solve reachability queries with some number  of vertex failures. For example: "Can vertex  still reach vertex  even though vertices  have failed and can no longer be used?" A similar problem may consider edge failures rather than vertex failures, or a mix of the two. The breadth-first search technique works just as well on such queries, but constructing an efficient oracle is more challenging.

Another problem related to reachability queries is in quickly recalculating changes to reachability relationships when some portion of the graph is changed. For example, this is a relevant concern to garbage collection which needs to balance the reclamation of memory (so that it may be reallocated) with the performance concerns of the running application.

See also 
 Gammoid
 st-connectivity

References

Graph connectivity